Willi Sandner (8 March 1911 – June 1984) was a German speed skater. He competed in four events at the 1936 Winter Olympics. Sandner was a six time national champion and set a dozen national records.

References

External links
 

1911 births
1984 deaths
German male speed skaters
Olympic speed skaters of Germany
Speed skaters at the 1936 Winter Olympics
Sportspeople from Munich
20th-century German people